Spøta Spur is a spur extending from the north-central part of Mount Hochlin, in the Muhlig-Hofmann Mountains, Queen Maud Land. Mapped by Norwegian cartographers from surveys and air photos by the Norwegian Antarctic Expedition (1956–60) and named Spøta (the knitting needle).

References

Ridges of Queen Maud Land
Princess Martha Coast